Ivan Amodei (born August 22, 1976) is an illusionist. Amodei performs at the Beverly Wilshire Hotel and also tours internationally with his show Secrets and Illusions.

Career

In 1999, Amodei became a regular performer at the Magic Castle in Hollywood.  In 2005, he won first place at the International Brotherhood of Magicians Close-Up Competition. In 2005, he won FIRST place at the Society of American Magicians Close-Up Competition, as well as, the People's Choice Award.

In 2010, Amodei's book Magic's Most Amazing Stories was published and was nominated by ForeWord Review for book of the year. On October 23, 2010, Amodei opened a one-man show at the Four Seasons Hotel Westlake Village. It was named Made in Italy. On December 31, 2010, Amodei did a guest appearance at the Beverly Wilshire Hotel in Beverly Hills that led to an open run of his show at the hotel. The name of the show was then changed to Intimate Illusions. Splash magazine called him a "master in his art." In May 2012, Westlake Magazine included Ivan in their achievers issue. In June 2012, Amodei received recognition by the honorable Mayor of Beverly Hills William W. Brien M.D. for his contribution to the world of magic and illusion.

Personal life
Amodei currently lives in Southern California on his ranch with his twin boy and girl and wife. In 2016, he appeared on the season finale of Penn & Teller: Fool Us on which he was determined to have fooled Penn & Teller based on judges' decision.

References

External links
 

1976 births
Living people
American magicians
People from Brooklyn